Dzintars Rasnačs (born 17 July 1963) is a Latvian politician. He is a member of the National Alliance Party and a deputy of the 11th Saeima (Latvian Parliament). He began his current term in parliament on 17 October 2011. He has graduated from the University of Latvia.

From 1995 to 1998 and 2014 to 2019, he was Minister of Justice.

References

1963 births
Living people
People from Jūrmala
For Fatherland and Freedom/LNNK politicians
National Alliance (Latvia) politicians
Ministers of Justice of Latvia
Deputies of the 7th Saeima
Deputies of the 8th Saeima
Deputies of the 9th Saeima
Deputies of the 10th Saeima
Deputies of the 11th Saeima
Deputies of the 12th Saeima
Latvian jurists
University of Latvia alumni